Solanum viride, the green nightshade, garland berry, cannibal's tomato, poroporo or boro dina, is a species of flowering plant in the family Solanaceae. It is native to a number of south Pacific Islands, and has been introduced to Hawaii. In Fiji at the time of contact, human meat was cooked wrapped in its leaves, and a condiment for the meal was made from the fruit.

References

viride
Flora of Fiji
Flora of Niue
Flora of Samoa
Flora of Tokelau and Manihiki
Flora of Tonga
Flora of the Cook Islands
Flora of the Marquesas Islands
Flora of the Pitcairn Islands
Flora of the Society Islands
Flora of the Tuamotus
Flora of the Tubuai Islands
Plants described in 1807
Flora without expected TNC conservation status